This article lists the orders made by airlines and other buyers for the Boeing 737 MAX family of aircraft, which is a product of Boeing Commercial Airplanes, a division of the Boeing Company.

For a discussion of these orders and deliveries, in particular, the effect of the groundings in 2019, see Boeing 737 MAX, Orders and deliveries.

Orders and deliveries

Orders and deliveries by year
{| class="wikitable" style="margin:1em 1em 1em 300; border:1px #aaa solid; background:#fbf8db;"
|+ Boeing 737 MAX orders and deliveries
|- style="font-weight:bold; background:#ccddff; padding:0.4em;"
|| ||2011||2012||2013||2014||2015||2016||2017||2018||2019||2020||2021||2022||2023||Total
|-
|Orders||150||914||708||891||410||540||774||662||−136||−529||375||561||-4||5,316
|-
|Deliveries||–||–||–||–||–||–||74||256||57||27||245||374||59||1092
|-
|}

Cumulative Boeing 737 MAX orders and deliveries

Orders and deliveries by customer
The following table shows total firm orders and deliveries of Boeing 737 MAX aircraft by variant (where known) and customer.

Boeing has 236 737 MAX 7 and 720 737 MAX 10 in backlog as of December 31, 2022.

Orders as of July 18, 2022. Deliveries as of July 25, 2022.

Notes

Orders and deliveries graph
The following graph shows total firm orders and deliveries of Boeing 737 MAX aircraft.

.

See also

References

 

Boeing 737 MAX orders
737 MAX